Nameless Creek is a stream in Hancock County, Indiana, in the United States.

Nameless Creek was so named in about 1830 when an early settler inquired about the name of a creek he had crossed, and upon learning it had no name, said, "It is a nameless creek", and the name stuck ever since.

See also
List of rivers of Indiana

References

Rivers of Hancock County, Indiana
Rivers of Indiana